Clitheroe Football Club are an English football club based in Clitheroe, Lancashire, currently playing in the .

History

Early history
The club was formed as Clitheroe Central in 1891 as a split from the existing Clitheroe Football Club, at the Swan Hotel in Castle Street by local businessmen. After playing in local leagues, the club joined the Lancashire Combination in 1903, and in 1910 the club was wound up and withdrawn from the Combination because of the lack of geographical exclusivity.  As the board meeting had been held without reference to the shareholders, a further meeting was called, but Clitheroe Central's resignation from the Combination stood and the players awarded free transfers.

During this period,  Central played their games at the Upbrooks ground, located behind houses on Salthill Road and now partially built over. In 1925 the club moved a few hundred yards to its present home of Shawbridge.

20th century
The club was refounded in 1924, and, after a season in the North-East Lancashire Combination, rejoined the Lancashire Combination for the 1925-26 season.  Clitheroe remained there until the end of the 1981–82 season. They won the Lancashire Combination Cup in the 1934–35 season and the League Championship in the 1979–80 season.

For the 1982–83 season the Lancashire Combination amalgamated with the Cheshire County League to become the North West Counties League. Clitheroe became one of the founder members, however the state of the ground meant they started in the third division. There then followed one of the most successful periods in the club's long history when under the guidance of manager Eric Whalley they won the Third, Second and First Divisions in consecutive seasons, as well as securing the Lancashire Cup in 1985.

In the 1995–96 season when under the joint managership of Dennis Underwood and Gary Butcher they played at Wembley Stadium in the final of the FA Vase. Some 7,500 people watched the game against Brigg Town and although Clitheroe won against them earlier in the season in the FA Cup the club was beaten 3–0 in the Vase Final. A public appeal to help with the visit to Wembley saw £7,400 donated by townspeople and businesses.

The last decade of the 20th century saw most of the ten years spent getting the ground up to scratch with £130,000 being spent in the process. The sale of two players, Jon Penman and Carlo Nash, helped considerably with the expenditure on the ground.
The club saw little success on the pitch after the Wembley visit until manager Steve Parry led them to the Floodlight Trophy by beating Kidsgrove Athletic 2–1 in the 1998–99 final.

21st century

Dave Burgess took over the management of the first team in 2000–01 after several successful years running the second string, with player Lee Sculpher as his assistant. In their first season they finished as league runners-up and FA Vase semi-finalists.

Work commitments led to Burgess standing down in 2001–02. Sculpher took over and again finished as league runners-up before losing 2–1 to Mossley in the League Cup final at Bury's Gigg Lane ground.

Early cup exits the following season enabled the Blues to concentrate on the league and their away form saw the 2003–04 NWCFL championship won on the final day of the season with a 3–2 victory at Nantwich Town – a late goal from Neil Reynolds sealing the title, the trophy lifted by captain Adam Gardner and club stalwart Keith Lord. With the title came the reward of promotion to the Northern Premier League for the 2004-05 season.

Northern Premier League

In November 2004 Lee Sculpher resigned as manager and short spells in charge by Paul Byron, Tommy Lawson and Mark Smitheringale followed before Chris Stammers was appointed manager in September 2006. After the 10–1 loss to Kettering Town in the FA Trophy, Stammers tendered his resignation stating that he had taken the club as far as he could. His assistant Ash Berry took temporary charge of team affairs before the club appointed Neil Reynolds and Kendal's veteran player Peter Smith as the new management team in December. Smith took over sole managerial duties at the end of the 2008-09 season, going on to lead the club to 8th (2009–10) and 6th (2010–11) place finishes, the highest league placings in the club's history to date.

The end of the 2010-11 season saw Pete Smith replaced as manager by Carl Garner, club chairman of four years' standing. The vacant position of Chair was taken over by Garner's long-standing deputy Anne Barker, who remains in the role. Early success for Garner in 2011-12 (including the Manager of the Month award) was followed by a tailing off in form. He resigned with ten games to go, Dave Burgess and Lee Sculpher returning on a temporary basis to see the season out.

Paul Moore took over the reins in 2012-13, leading Clitheroe to their record points haul and an 8th-place finish. In contrast, a poor start to the 2013-14 season, with early exits from the FA Cup and Trophy, saw Moore replaced by ex-Blue Simon Garner, son of former chairman/manager Carl. With his assistant (and another ex-Blue) Ryan Parr, Garner secured safety with a 17th-place finish, improving on this for 2014-15 with 13th place and an appearance in the Lancashire Challenge Trophy final (a 3-0 defeat to Chorley). The good work continued into 2015-16 when a strong playoff push only faltered in the closing weeks of the season, resulting in a creditable 7th-place finish. Garner and Parr stood down at the season's end, citing family reasons.

In April 2016, Simon Haworth was appointed manager, assisted by Gareth Roberts, with coaches Ian Johnson and Irfan Kawri. In May 2017 the management team were joined by Ben Kay, former joint manager at Ashton Athletic. In June 2017, Gareth Roberts left the role of Assistant Manager to join Skelmersdale United.

Honours

Lancashire FA Challenge Trophy
Winners 1984–85
Lancashire Combination Division Two
Champions 1959-60
Lancashire Combination Division One
Champions 1979-80
North West Counties Football League Division Three
Champions 1983-84
North West Counties Football League Division Two
Champions 1984-85
North West Counties Football League Division One
Champions 1985–86, 2003–04
North West Counties Floodlit Trophy
Winners 1998-99

Records

Best FA Cup performance: 3rd Qualifying Round 1959-60, 1965–66, 1967–68, 2007-08, 2022-23
Best FA Vase performance: Finalists 1995-96, Semi-finalists 2000-01
Record attendance: 2,050 (vs Mangotsfield United, FA Vase semi-final 1995-96)
Record transfer: £45,000 for Carlo Nash to Crystal Palace F.C.

References

External links

Clitheroe FC Unofficial website
Official Website

 
Football clubs in England
Football clubs in Lancashire
1877 establishments in England
Association football clubs established in 1877
Sport in Ribble Valley
Lancashire League (football)
Lancashire Combination
North West Counties Football League clubs
Northern Premier League clubs